Wagawaga may be,

Wagawaga language (Australia)
Wagawaga language (New Guinea)